Robert Onder Jr. (born January 6, 1962) is an American politician and physician from the state of Missouri. A Republican, he is a member of the Missouri Senate serving the 2nd District, in the St. Charles area. He was elected Assistant Majority Floor Leader in 2015. Onder previously was a member of the Missouri House of Representatives from 2007 to 2008.

Personal life
Onder attended St. Louis University High School, graduating in 1980.  Onder attended Washington University in St. Louis for his undergraduate degree, where he graduated summa cum laude with a degree in Economics. Onder subsequently graduated from Washington University School of Medicine, and is a physician specializing in allergy and asthma care. He later graduated from Saint Louis University School of Law. He and his wife Allison have six children; Robert, Elizabeth, Michael, Joseph, Christine, and Peter. Onder has recently obtained his Pilot’s license.

Political campaigns

Onder served a single term in the Missouri House of Representatives from 2007 to 2008, having been elected in 2006.

In 2008, Onder left the state legislature to run for the US House in Missouri's 9th congressional district, where incumbent Kenny Hulshof was not seeking re-election. Onder distinguished himself as one of the more fiscally conservative candidates, emphasizing his free-market voting record in the Missouri House and earning the endorsement of the Club for Growth.  Onder ultimately lost the Republican primary election to Blaine Luetkemeyer.

In 2014, Onder ran for the Missouri Senate in the 2nd district, defeating Chuck Gatschenberger and Vicki Schneider in the Republican primary. No Democrats ran for the seat, so this primary victory was tantamount to election. Onder ran for reelection in 2018 and defeated his Democratic challenger to earn a second term.

In 2022, Onder is running in the Republican primary for Saint Charles County Executive. He withdrew from the Republican primary on June 7, 2022.

State House of Representatives career

Immigration reform
In 2008, Onder authored and sponsored HB 1549, a piece of legislation targeting undocumented persons. The bill forbade the creation of sanctuary cities in Missouri, allowed for cancellation of state contracts for contractors if they hired undocumented persons, and required public agencies to verify the legal status of immigrants before providing social service benefits. Additionally the bill criminalized the transportation of immigrants for exploitative purposes. The bill passed the State House and Senate with strong support and was signed into law by Matt Blunt.

Abortion
Onder also sponsored legislation that would have strengthened Missouri's informed consent before abortion statute, including requiring abortion clinics to allow pregnant people the opportunity to view an ultrasound of the fetus. The bill also would have criminalized coercing a woman to have an abortion through abuse, violence or threats. The bill passed the State House by a vote of 112-33 but died after a filibuster in the State Senate.

State Senate career

Leadership
In his first year in the Senate, Onder was elected to Senate leadership as Assistant Majority Floor Leader. In 2017 he became the Chairman of the General Laws Committee. Additionally, he serves as Vice-Chairman of the Committee on Judiciary and Civil and Criminal Jurisprudence. In 2016, Onder attended the 2016 Republican National Convention after his selection as a Trump delegate as part of the Missouri delegation.

Caucus membership

Onder was a founding member of the Missouri Senate's Conservative Caucus. The Conservative Caucus's top issues include regulatory reform, tort reform, health care reform, abortion, and gun rights.

Social issues
In 2016, Onder introduced Senate Joint Resolution 39, a proposed amendment to the Missouri Constitution that would protect wedding industry businesses that refuse to serve LGBTQIA+ couples. This bill passed the Senate over a Democratic filibuster, but failed to make it out of committee in the House.

Onder was an outspoken supporter of HB 1562, a bill that expanded the crime of sex trafficking to include the advertisement of minors for prostitution or pornography.

Onder is anti-abortion, he was the original author of legislation that requires annual, unannounced state inspections of healthcare clinics that provide reproductive healthcare; bars clinics from instructing ambulances to silence their sirens or turn their lights off; mandates that pathologists test fetal tissue; enacts whistleblower protections for employees of abortion clinics; and exempts pregnancy resource centers from a St. Louis ordinance barring discrimination over reproductive choices. Onder's bill received a few significant changes, such as changing the pathologist deadline from 24 hours to five days, and became Senate Bill 5, with a new sponsor in Senator Andrew Koenig. The bill was strengthened and passed by the Missouri House of Representatives, then passed by a vote of 22-9 in the Missouri Senate and signed by Governor Eric Greitens.

In 2019, Onder strongly pushed for the Missouri Stands for the Unborn Act, a bill that banned abortion at eight weeks of pregnancy or later. The bill also banned abortions due to race, sex or a diagnosis of Down syndrome. The Missouri Senate passed the bill 24-10, and was subsequently passed by the house. The bill was signed into law by Governor Mike Parson.

Ethics
Onder also advocated for ethics reform, sponsoring and handling legislation that called for a "cooling off period" between when Missouri legislators leave office and when they can become lobbyists. Onder said that public service "is not supposed to be our pathway job into a lucrative lobbying job." Additionally, Onder sponsored a bill that would have banned gifts from lobbyists to legislators in Missouri.

Labor reform
Onder supported legislation that would have made Missouri the 28th Right-to-Work state. The bill passed through Onder's General Laws Committee before being sent to the Senate floor. While the bill was signed into law by Eric Greitens, it was later repealed by ballot initiative.

Onder authored SB 182, a bill that banned union-only project labor agreements in Missouri. The bill was signed into law by Governor Greitens.

In 2018, Onder handled HB 1413, a landmark public union bill that created transparency and accountability to protect the rights of Missouri public sector unions. Onder passed the bill through the Senate and HB 1413 was signed into law.

Economic issues
In 2017, Onder was the Senate handler for HB 130, a bill that creates a statewide regulatory framework for transportation networking companies. The bill passed with overwhelming support by a vote of 144-7 in the House and by 30-1 in the Senate. Missouri Governor Eric Greitens signed the bill into law.

In 2019, Onder introduced bills aimed at deregulating the Missouri economy. One of Onder's bills would only require cars 10 years old or older and 150,000 miles to be inspected, as opposed to 5 year old cars as under current law. Onder claimed the inspection requirement is a waste of time and money for citizens. "It disrupts the single mom, the senior citizens, the working parents day and their week these unnecessary and costly inspections," Onder stated.

Onder worked to defeat a proposed HMO tax in 2019. On his opposition to the tax, Onder stated: "Two of my most important promises to my constituents when I ran for Senate were to fight the rising costs of health care for businesses and their employees, and to oppose tax increases. So when a new health insurance tax was proposed by my own party, I was obligated to oppose it, regardless of political cost." Due to the opposition of Onder and other senators, the HMO tax proposal was removed.

In 2020, Onder introduced SB 560, a bill that would grant state licensing reciprocity to nonresident military spouses. While testifying in favor of his bill before the Veterans and Military Affairs Committee, Onder declared: "military spouses do not lose their knowledge or skills as they cross state lines in the service to their country. This is the least we can do for these heroes and their families."

Second Amendment

In 2019, Onder introduced legislation to allow people with concealed carry permits to bring a firearm onto public transit. Onder cited safety concerns and problems of crime on public transit. Onder said that the current law prevents "the right of law-abiding citizens to defend themselves." The bill did not pass that session, so Onder refiled it for the 2020 legislative session.

Committee assignments (2019 - 2021) 

 Commerce, Consumer Protection, Energy & the Environment
 Education
 Health and Pensions, Chairman
 Judiciary and Civil and Criminal Jurisprudence, (Vice-Chairman)
 Ways and Means
 Joint Committee on Administrative Rules
 Joint Committee on Public Assistance
 Joint Committee on Tax Policy
 Select Committee on Redistricting
 Task Force on Substance Abuse Prevention and Treatment

Committee assignments (2017 - 2019)
 Health and Pensions (Chairman)
 Judiciary and Civil and Criminal Jurisprudence (Vice-Chairman)
 Commerce, Consumer Protection, Energy & the Environment
 Education
 Ways and Means
 Joint Committee on Administrative Rules
 Joint Committee on Tax Policy

Legislative awards and other honors
Onder has won several awards during his time in the Missouri Senate, including
2015 Missouri Academy of Family Physicians Award
2015 Missouri Centurion Award
2015 Missouri Alliance for Freedom Champion of Freedom Award
2015 Missouri Chamber of Commerce and Industry Freshman of the Year Award
2016 American Conservative Union Conservative Excellence Award
2016 Missouri Family Policy Council Missouri Family Champion Award
2016 Missouri Dental Association Legislative Excellence Award
2017 Missouri Association of Prosecuting Attorneys Legislative Champion Award
2017 Missouri Chamber of Commerce Spirit of Enterprise Award
2018 American Legislative Exchange Council Legislator of the Week Award
2019 Missouri Solar Energy Industries Association Award
2020 Missouri Association of Prosecuting Attorneys Legislative Champion Award
2020 American Conservative Union Award for Conservative Excellence

Electoral history

References

External links
 Official government website 
 Campaign website

1962 births
21st-century American politicians
Living people
Republican Party members of the Missouri House of Representatives
Republican Party Missouri state senators
People from Lake St. Louis, Missouri
Physicians from Missouri
Saint Louis University School of Law alumni
Washington University School of Medicine alumni
Washington University in St. Louis alumni